Phlyarus basirufipennis is a species of beetle in the family Cerambycidae. It was described by Breuning in 1961. It is knowen from Borneo and Myanmar.

References

Desmiphorini
Beetles described in 1961